Nour Hadhria (born 4 September 1990) is a retired Tunisian football midfielder. He was a squad member at the 2007 FIFA U-17 World Cup.

References

1990 births
Living people
Tunisian footballers
Tunisia youth international footballers
Club Africain players
CA Bizertin players
AS Marsa players
Association football midfielders
Tunisian Ligue Professionnelle 1 players